Juan Domínguez Otaegui (born 29 December 1983) is a Spanish former footballer who played as a forward, currently a manager.

Playing career
Domínguez was born in San Sebastián, Gipuzkoa. Formed in Real Sociedad's youth system, he made his senior debut with the B team in Segunda División B. On 2 March 2005 he played his first La Liga game, coming on as a substitute for Óscar de Paula in the 87th minute of a 2–1 home win against Real Zaragoza.

Domínguez spent the following two seasons on loan, with SD Eibar (Segunda División) and Real Unión (third tier), both in the Basque Country. In the summer of 2007, his contract expired and the free agent signed with UE Lleida in division three, only managing to score twice during the campaign.

Domínguez returned to Unión for 2008–09, helping the Irun club return to the second division after 44 years but being immediately relegated. On 30 June 2010 he signed with another side in that league, Gimnàstic de Tarragona. However, he failed to impress during his tenure, and in January was loaned to former team Eibar until the end of the season.

In late January 2012, Domínguez was released by Nàstic. On 4 February, he signed a contract with third-tier CD Guijuelo.

Coaching career
Domínguez returned to Real Unión for a third spell on 4 July 2012, going on to see out his career with the club in the third division and being immediately appointed its manager on 19 May 2018.

In the summer of 2019, Domínguez signed as youth coach of Real Sociedad.

Managerial statistics

References

External links

1983 births
Living people
Spanish footballers
Footballers from San Sebastián
Association football forwards
La Liga players
Segunda División players
Segunda División B players
Real Sociedad B footballers
Real Sociedad footballers
SD Eibar footballers
Real Unión footballers
UE Lleida players
Gimnàstic de Tarragona footballers
CD Guijuelo footballers
Spanish football managers
Segunda División B managers
Real Unión managers
Real Sociedad non-playing staff